The following is a partial list of named, but unincorporated, communities in the state of North Carolina. To be listed, the unincorporated community should either be, a census-designated place (CDP) or a place with at least a few commercial businesses. A crossroads is not necessarily considered an unincorporated "community". Former incorporated towns usually qualify.

Alamance County
Altamahaw, North Carolina
Glen Raven, North Carolina
Saxapahaw, North Carolina
Woodlawn, North Carolina

Alexander County
Bethlehem, North Carolina
Hiddenite, North Carolina 
Stony Point, North Carolina

Alleghany County
Cherry Lane, North Carolina
Glade Valley, North Carolina
Piney Creek, North Carolina
Roaring Gap, North Carolina

Anson County
Burnsville, North Carolina

Ashe County
Grassy Creek, North Carolina
Sturgills, North Carolina

Avery County
Linville, North Carolina

Beaufort County
Bayview, North Carolina
Pinetown, North Carolina
River Road, North Carolina

Bertie County
Grabtown, North Carolina

Bladen County
Butters, North Carolina
Kelly, North Carolina
White Oak, North Carolina

Brunswick County
Supply, North Carolina
Sunset Harbor, North Carolina
Winnabow, North Carolina

Buncombe County
Arden, North Carolina
Avery Creek, North Carolina
Barnardsville, North Carolina (incorporated until 1970)
Bent Creek, North Carolina
Candler, North Carolina
Enka, North Carolina
Fairview, North Carolina - CDP, not the town of Fairview, in Union County
Forks of Ivy, North Carolina
Jupiter, North Carolina (incorporated until 1970)
Oteen, North Carolina
Reems Creek, North Carolina
Riceville, North Carolina
Royal Pines, North Carolina
Skyland, North Carolina
Stocksville, North Carolina
Swannanoa, North Carolina

Burke County
Icard, North Carolina
Salem, North Carolina

Cabarrus County
Odell School, North Carolina

Caldwell County
Collettsville, North Carolina
Northlakes, North Carolina

Camden County
Belcross, North Carolina
Camden, North Carolina
Old Trap, North Carolina
Riddle, North Carolina
Shiloh, North Carolina
South Mills, North Carolina

Carteret County
Atlantic, North Carolina
Broad Creek, North Carolina
Davis, North Carolina
Gloucester, North Carolina
Harkers Island, North Carolina
Marshallberg, North Carolina
Sealevel, North Carolina

Caswell County
Casville, North Carolina
Leasburg, North Carolina
Pelham, North Carolina
Prospect Hill, North Carolina
Purley, North Carolina
Semora, North Carolina

Catawba County
Lake Norman of Catawba, North Carolina
Mountain View, North Carolina
Sherrills Ford, North Carolina
St. Stephens, North Carolina
Terrell, North Carolina

Chatham County
Bennett, North Carolina
Bynum, North Carolina 
Fearrington Village, North Carolina
Gulf, North Carolina
Moncure, North Carolina

Cherokee County
Marble, North Carolina

Chowan County
Rockyhock, North Carolina

Clay County
Warne, North Carolina

Cleveland County
Light Oak, North Carolina

Columbus County
Delco, North Carolina
Evergreen, North Carolina
Hallsboro, North Carolina
Riegelwood, North Carolina
Riverview, North Carolina

Craven County
Brices Creek, North Carolina
Fairfield Harbour, North Carolina
James City, North Carolina
Neuse Forest, North Carolina

Cumberland County
Vander, North Carolina

Currituck County
Carova Beach, North Carolina
Coinjock, North Carolina
Currituck, North Carolina
Grandy, North Carolina
Gregory, North Carolina
Knotts Island, North Carolina
Moyock, North Carolina
Point Harbor, North Carolina
Shawboro, North Carolina

Dare County
Avon, North Carolina
Buxton, North Carolina
Frisco, North Carolina
Hatteras, North Carolina
Manns Harbor, North Carolina
Rodanthe, North Carolina
Salvo, North Carolina
Wanchese, North Carolina
Waves, North Carolina

Davidson County
Arcadia, North Carolina 
Churchland, North Carolina
Linwood, North Carolina
Silver Valley, North Carolina 
Southmont, North Carolina
Reeds, North Carolina 
Tyro, North Carolina
Welcome, North Carolina
Yadkin College, North Carolina

Davie County
Advance, North Carolina
Hillsdale, North Carolina

Duplin County
Potters Hill, North Carolina

Durham County
Bahama, North Carolina
Gorman, North Carolina
Nelson, North Carolina
Rougemont, North Carolina

Edgecombe County
Crisp, North Carolina
Mercer, North Carolina

Forsyth County
Belews Creek, North Carolina
Bethabara, North Carolina
Donnaha, North Carolina
Dozier, North Carolina
Germanton, North Carolina
Pfafftown, North Carolina
Seward, North Carolina
Stanleyville, North Carolina
Union Cross, North Carolina
Vienna, North Carolina

Franklin County
Centerville, North Carolina
Lake Royale, North Carolina

Gaston County
South Gastonia, North Carolina

Gates County
Buckland, North Carolina
Corapeake, North Carolina
Eure, North Carolina
Gates, North Carolina 
Hobbsville, North Carolina
Roduco, North Carolina
Sandy Cross, North Carolina
Sunbury, North Carolina
Tarheel, North Carolina
White Oak, North Carolina

Graham County
Tapoco, North Carolina

Granville County
Belltown, North Carolina
Berea, North Carolina
Brassfield, North Carolina
Bullock, North Carolina
Clay, North Carolina
Cozart, North Carolina
Cornwall, North Carolina
Culbreth, North Carolina
Dexter, North Carolina
Dickerson, North Carolina
Fairport, North Carolina
Gela, North Carolina
Goshen, North Carolina
Grassy Creek, North Carolina
Grissom, North Carolina
Hebron, North Carolina
Hester, North Carolina
Horner, North Carolina
Huntsboro, North Carolina
Jonathan Crossroads, North Carolina
Kinton Fork, North Carolina
Knap of Reeds, North Carolina
Lewis, North Carolina
Lyons, North Carolina
Mount Energy, North Carolina
Oak Hill, North Carolina
Northside, North Carolina
Providence, North Carolina
Satterwhite, North Carolina
Shoofly, North Carolina
Tar River, North Carolina
Wilbourns, North Carolina
Wilton, North Carolina

Greene County
Maury, North Carolina
Ormondsville, North Carolina
Scuffleton, North Carolina
Jason, North Carolina

Guilford County
Browns Summit, North Carolina
Climax, North Carolina
Colfax, North Carolina
Forest Oaks, North Carolina
Julian, North Carolina
McLeansville, North Carolina
Monticello, North Carolina

Halifax County
Hollister, North Carolina
South Rosemary, North Carolina
South Weldon, North Carolina

Harnett County
Anderson Creek, North Carolina
Barbecue, North Carolina
Barclaysville, North Carolina
Buies Creek, North Carolina
Bunnlevel, North Carolina
Cape Fear, North Carolina
Chalybeate Springs, North Carolina
Cokesbury, North Carolina
Duncan, North Carolina
Flat Branch, North Carolina
Fonville, North Carolina
Johnsonville, North Carolina
Harnett, North Carolina
Kipling, North Carolina
Luart, North Carolina
Mamers, North Carolina
Olivia, North Carolina
Overhills, North Carolina
Pineview, North Carolina
Rawls, North Carolina
Ryes, North Carolina
Seminole, North Carolina
Shawtown, North Carolina
Spout Springs, North Carolina
Turlington, North Carolina

Haywood County
Crabtree, North Carolina
Fines Creek, North Carolina
Lake Junaluska, North Carolina
West Canton, North Carolina

Henderson County
Balfour, North Carolina
Barker Heights, North Carolina
Dana, North Carolina
East Flat Rock, North Carolina
Edneyville, North Carolina
Etowah, North Carolina
Fruitland, North Carolina
Gerton, North Carolina
Hoopers Creek, North Carolina
Horse Shoe, North Carolina
Mountain Home, North Carolina
Valley Hill, North Carolina

Hertford County
Tuscarora Beach, North Carolina

Hoke County
Ashley Heights, North Carolina
Bowmore, North Carolina
Dundarrach, North Carolina
Five Points, North Carolina
Rockfish, North Carolina
Silver City, North Carolina

Hyde County
Engelhard, North Carolina
Fairfield, North Carolina
Ocracoke, North Carolina
Swan Quarter, North Carolina

Iredell County
Stony Point, North Carolina

Jackson County
Balsam, North Carolina
Cashiers, North Carolina
Cherokee, North Carolina
Cullowhee, North Carolina
Glenville, North Carolina

Johnston County
Cleveland, North Carolina
Flowers, North Carolina
Grabtown, North Carolina
West Smithfield, North Carolina

Jones County
Comfort, North Carolina
Oak Grove, North Carolina

Lee County
Lemon Springs, North Carolina

Lenoir County
Jackson Heights, North Carolina

Lincoln County
Boger City, North Carolina
Denver, North Carolina
Iron Station, North Carolina
Lowesville, North Carolina
Westport, North Carolina

Macon County
Otto, North Carolina

Madison County
Belva, North Carolina
Foster Creek, North Carolina
Guntertown, North Carolina
Joe, North Carolina
Luck, North Carolina
Petersburg, North Carolina
Springcreek, North Carolina
Spillcorn, North Carolina
Revere, North Carolina
Trust, North Carolina
Walnut, North Carolina
Wolf Laurel, North Carolina

Martin County
Goose Nest Township, North Carolina

McDowell County
Little Switzerland, North Carolina
West Marion, North Carolina

Mecklenburg County
Caldwell, North Carolina
Pineville, North Carolina

Mitchell County
Penland, North Carolina

Montgomery County
Black Ankle, North Carolina
Ether, North Carolina
Okeewemee, North Carolina
Ophir, North Carolina
Steeds, North Carolina

Moore County
Pinehurst, North Carolina
Pumpkin Center, North Carolina
Highfalls, North Carolina
Putnam, North Carolina
Glendon, North Carolina
McConnell, North Carolina
Bensalem, North Carolina
Westmoore, North Carolina
Dover, North Carolina
West Philadelphia, North Carolina
Spies, North Carolina
Foxfire, North Carolina

Nash County
Hilliardston, North Carolina

New Hanover County
Bayshore, North Carolina
Blue Clay Farms, North Carolina
Castle Hayne, North Carolina
Hightsville, North Carolina
Kings Grant, North Carolina
Kirkland, North Carolina
Masonboro, North Carolina 
Murraysville, North Carolina
Myrtle Grove, North Carolina
Northchase, North Carolina
Ogden, North Carolina
Porters Neck, North Carolina
Sea Breeze, North Carolina
Seagate, North Carolina
Silver Lake, North Carolina
Skippers Corner, North Carolina
Smith Creek, North Carolina
Windemere, North Carolina 
Wrightsboro, North Carolina

Northampton County
Pleasant Hill, North Carolina

Onslow County
Half Moon, North Carolina
Petersburg, North Carolina
Piney Green, North Carolina
Pumpkin Center, North Carolina
Sneads Ferry, North Carolina

Orange County

Blackwood, North Carolina
Buckhorn, North Carolina
Caldwell, North Carolina
Calvander, North Carolina
Carr, North Carolina
Cedar Grove, North Carolina
Dodsons Crossroads, North Carolina
Dogwood Acres, North Carolina
Efland, North Carolina
Eno, North Carolina
Eubanks, North Carolina
Fairview, Hillsborough, North Carolina
Hurdle Mills, North Carolina
Laws, North Carolina
McDade, North Carolina
Miles, North Carolina
Oaks, North Carolina
Orange Grove, North Carolina
Piney Grove, North Carolina
Rougemont, North Carolina
Schley, North Carolina
Teer, North Carolina
University, North Carolina
White Cross, North Carolina

Pamlico County
Hobucken, North Carolina

Pasquotank County
Nixonton, North Carolina
Weeksville, North Carolina

Pender County
Hampstead, North Carolina
Rocky Point, North Carolina

Perquimans County
New Hope, North Carolina
Woodville, North Carolina

Person County
Ai, North Carolina
Allensville, North Carolina
Bethel Hill, North Carolina
Brooksdale, North Carolina
Bushy Fork, North Carolina
Ceffo, North Carolina
Concord, North Carolina
Cunningham, North Carolina
Denny Store, North Carolina
Five Forks, North Carolina
Gentry Store, North Carolina
Gordonton, North Carolina
Hesters Store, North Carolina
Hurdle Mills, North Carolina
Leasburg, North Carolina
Longhurst, North Carolina
Longs Store, North Carolina
Moriah, North Carolina
Mount Tirzah, North Carolina
Olive Hill, North Carolina
Paynes Tavern, North Carolina
Peeds Store, North Carolina
Rougemont, North Carolina
Semora, North Carolina
Somerset, North Carolina
Surl, North Carolina
Timberlake, North Carolina
Triple Springs, North Carolina
Whitt Town, North Carolina
Woodsdale, North Carolina

Pitt County
Bell Arthur, North Carolina
Belvoir, North Carolina
Stokes, North Carolina

Polk County
Lynn, North Carolina
Mill Spring, North Carolina

Randolph County
Cedar Grove, North Carolina
Climax, North Carolina
Coleridge, North Carolina
Erect, North Carolina
Farmer, North Carolina
Sophia, North Carolina
Ulah, North Carolina
Whynot, North Carolina

Richmond County
Cordova, North Carolina
East Rockingham, North Carolina

Robeson County
Barker Ten Mile, North Carolina
Elrod, North Carolina
Prospect, North Carolina
Raemon, North Carolina
Rex, North Carolina
Shannon, North Carolina
Tolarsville, North Carolina
Wakulla, North Carolina

Rockingham County
Monroeton, North Carolina
Ruffin, North Carolina

Rowan County
Enochville, North Carolina
Gold Hill, North Carolina

Rutherford County
Caroleen, North Carolina
Cliffside, North Carolina
Henrietta, North Carolina

Sampson County
Bonnetsville, North Carolina
Delway, North Carolina
Ingold, North Carolina
Ivanhoe, North Carolina
Keener, North Carolina
Plain View, North Carolina
Spivey's Corner, North Carolina
Vann Crossroads, North Carolina

Scotland County
Deercroft, North Carolina
Laurel Hill, North Carolina
Old Hundred, North Carolina
Scotch Meadows, North Carolina

Stanly County
Aquadale, North Carolina
Millingport, North Carolina
Palestine, North Carolina
Porter, North Carolina

Stokes County
Brook Cove, North Carolina
Campbell, North Carolina
Collinstown, North Carolina
Dalton, North Carolina
Dillard, North Carolina
Dodgetown, North Carolina
Flat Rock, North Carolina
Francisco, North Carolina
Germanton, North Carolina
Hartman, North Carolina
Lawsonville, North Carolina
Meadows, North Carolina
Neatman, North Carolina
Pine Hall, North Carolina
Pinnacle, North Carolina
Poplar Springs, North Carolina
Prestonville, North Carolina
Quaker Gap, North Carolina
Sandy Ridge, North Carolina
Volunteer, North Carolina
Westfield, North Carolina

Surry County
Albion, North Carolina
Ararat, North Carolina
Ash Hill, North Carolina
Bannertown, North Carolina
Blackwater, North Carolina
Blevins Store, North Carolina
Boones Hill, North Carolina
Bottom, North Carolina
Burch, North Carolina
Cedar Hill, North Carolina
Combstown, North Carolina
Crooked Oak, North Carolina
Crutchfield, North Carolina
Devotion, North Carolina
Fairview Crossroads, North Carolina
Flat Rock, North Carolina
Franklin, North Carolina
Hills Grove, North Carolina
Indian Grove, North Carolina
Jenkinstown, North Carolina
Ladonia, North Carolina
Level Cross, North Carolina
Little Richmond, North Carolina
Long Hill, North Carolina
Lowgap, North Carolina
Mount Herman, North Carolina
Mountain Park, North Carolina
Mulberry, North Carolina
New Hope, North Carolina
Oak Grove, North Carolina
Pine Hill, North Carolina
Pine Ridge, North Carolina
Poplar Springs, North Carolina
Red Brush, North Carolina
Rockford, North Carolina
Round Peak, North Carolina
Salem, North Carolina
Salem Fork, North Carolina
Sheltontown, North Carolina
Shoals, North Carolina
Siloam, North Carolina
Slate Mountain, North Carolina
State Road, North Carolina
Stony Knoll, North Carolina
Thurmond, North Carolina
Toast, North Carolina
Turkey Ford, North Carolina
Union Cross, North Carolina
Union Hill, North Carolina
Westfield, North Carolina
White Plains, North Carolina
Woodville, North Carolina
Zephyr, North Carolina

Swain County
Cherokee, North Carolina

Transylvania County
Pisgah Forest, North Carolina

Tyrrell County
Fort Landing, North Carolina

Union County
JAARS, North Carolina

Vance County
South Henderson, North Carolina

Wake County
Asbury, North Carolina
Auburn, North Carolina
Banks, North Carolina
Barham, North Carolina
Bayleaf, North Carolina
Bonsal, North Carolina
Carpenter, North Carolina
Chestnut Hills, North Carolina
Clegg, North Carolina
Eagle Rock, North Carolina
Falls, North Carolina
Feltonville, North Carolina
Five Points, North Carolina
Forestville, North Carolina
Fowlers Crossroads, North Carolina
Friendship, North Carolina
Green Level, North Carolina
Holland, North Carolina
Hollemans Crossroads, North Carolina
Hopkins, North Carolina
Horseburg, North Carolina
Kennebec, North Carolina
Lassiter, North Carolina
Leesville, North Carolina
Lizard Lick, North Carolina
Macks Village, North Carolina
Marks Creek, North Carolina
McCullers, North Carolina
McCullers Crossroads, North Carolina
Medfield, North Carolina
Mount Pleasant, North Carolina
Neuse, North Carolina
New Hill, North Carolina
New Hope, North Carolina
New Light Township, North Carolina
Purnell, North Carolina
Riley Hill, North Carolina
Sandy Plain, North Carolina
Shotwell, North Carolina
Six Forks, North Carolina
Stony Hill, North Carolina
Swift Creek, North Carolina
Wake Crossroads, North Carolina
Wakefield, North Carolina
Walkers Crossroads, North Carolina
Westover, North Carolina
Wilbon, North Carolina
Williams Crossroads, North Carolina
Willow Spring, North Carolina
Wyatt, North Carolina

Warren County
Soul City, North Carolina

Washington County
Mackeys, North Carolina

Watauga County
Sugar Grove, North Carolina

Wayne County
Brogden, North Carolina
Elroy, North Carolina
Mar-Mac, North Carolina
Nahunta, North Carolina
New Hope, North Carolina
Rosewood, North Carolina

Wilkes County
Cricket, North Carolina
Fairplains, North Carolina
Ferguson, North Carolina
Hays, North Carolina 
Millers Creek, North Carolina 
Moravian Falls, North Carolina 
Mulberry, North Carolina
Pleasant Hill, North Carolina
Purlear, North Carolina

Wilson County
Montclair, North Carolina

Yadkin County
Courtney, North Carolina
Enon, North Carolina
Hamptonville, North Carolina
Huntsville, North Carolina
Richmond Hill, North Carolina
Smithtown, North Carolina

Yancey County
Wolf Laurel, North Carolina

See also
List of townships in North Carolina
List of municipalities in North Carolina
List of counties in North Carolina
List of North Carolina county seats

North Carolina
Uninicorp